Arthat St Mary's Orthodox Cathedral (Arthat Valiyapally) also called Kunnamkulam-Chattukulangara Church  is an ancient church located in Arthat village of Thalapilly Taluk, one mile south of Kunnamkulam town, Thrissur, Kerala, India. This church did not participate in the Synod of Diamper. During the invasion of Tippu Sultan the church was arsoned and later reconstructed.

History

Chattukulangara pally and late twentieth century historiography

A local belief having its origin in the late twentieth century states that Saint Thomas came to a region near present-day Kunnamkulam where Jews colonized. Joseph Cheeran, a former vicar and influential priest in the Malankara Orthodox Syrian Church promulgated these ideas. According to his theory, Saint Thomas preached gospel to the Jews and many were converted to Christianity. The Jewish Synagogue in that area is said to be converted to a Christian church. This church is claimed to be Chattukulangara pally. It is also said that St Thomas came to Judakunnu (Jew hill), there occurred a water scarcity in that area at that time. People were in great distress and they appealed to St Thomas for help. He is said to have whipped on the land on the top of the hill and there appeared a spring of fresh water. This is said to be later called Chattakkulam (ml:ചാട്ടക്കുളം) and it is hypothesised that the church near to it came to be known as Chattakkulangara pally. Cheeran's theory gained momentum and the Malankara Orthodox Syrian Church subscribes to this theory.

In contradistinction to this twentieth century identification, the traditional site where the establishment of a Christian community in the region is believed to have occurred has been the Palayur Church at least since the fourteenth century.

Cheeran therefore also claimed that the Palayoor Church previously belonged to the Arthat church as a chapel. He stated that the real Paloor church is Arthat church and claimed that the book Jornada by Antonio de Gouvea and Francis Buchanan's account of the Arthat church supports his theory. However Cheeran's theory has been slammed even by fellow Orthodox scholars such as Kurian Thomas Maledath, comparing Cheeran's books to children's literature and noting his theory ambitious and localistic.

The Synod of Diamper and Coonan Cross Oath
Antonio de Gouvea, a Portuguese missionary and chronicler of Dom Alexis de Menezes, records in his book "Jornada Dom Alexis de Menezes" about the church of Palur and other churches present nearby in the Kingdom of Zamorin:

In 1772, Kattumangattu Bishop sent a letter to Sakthan Thampuran (Sakthan thampuran page 289) which states, in Thalappilli there was only one church existing in that region, which is the Chattukulangara palli. There were 2 more chapels also present in that region viz. 1.Chiralayam 2. Pazhanji (dedicated to Geverghese sahada).

Starting from the Coonan cross oath of 1653, both the factions of Malankara Nasranis  wanted to take over the church to their fold and because of the dispute the church was closed for a while.  1805 with the request of the them, the then King of Cochin, Sakthan Thampuran himself came to Arthat church to resolve the problem. Both parties agreed for a lucky draw. In the lucky draw the main church and buildings were gone to the Malankara Puthenkoor Syrians and the Stone cross of the church gone to the Pazhayakoor Syrians.

Tippu Sultan's invasion and destruction
In 1789 Tippu Sultan attacked and arsoned this church. It is said in folklores that Tippu's army killed a priest in the Altar room of this church and the blood spilled over there. Since it was considered impure, some part of the Altar was cut and removed. Hence this church was also called as Vetti muricha pally (ml:വെട്ടി മുറിച്ച പള്ളി) or cut altar church. Even now the Altar of this church remain distinct from other churches.

The Coral Missionary Magazine of 1876 gives an account of the Arthat church in Kunnamkulam.

Relations with the Anglican Mission

In 1800 Francis Buchanan visited this church and met Pulikkottil Ittoop Ramban, (Pulikkottil Joseph Mar Dionysious I also known as Dionysius II).

In 1806 the Arthat Padiyola (resolution) declared to break all the chains of Rome, Babil & Antioch.

In 1808 Claudius Buchanan & Colin Macaulay made a visit and awarded a large gold medal to this principal church in the name of all Syrian Jacobite churches in Malabar.

This church has the largest cemetery(1 hectare) of all churches in Kerala. The present cemetery wall was built with the initiative of Geevarghese Mar Gregorios of Malankara.

Church architecture
The church was earlier built in Kerala Architectural style thatched with coconut palm leaves. During the attack of Tippu Sultan the church was arsoned. Later the church was restructured with wooden roof, thatched with clay tiles. Mar Dionysius II when he was a Ramban was instrumental in restructuring the church in the present state. The present structure was built during 1805-1827 CE.

Church feud
The feud between the Patriarch faction and the Catholicos faction lead the Patriarch faction to establish another church called Arthat St Mary's Simhasana church in 1920.

List of parishes separated from Arthat church
The following are the parishes separated from this church

 Chiralayam
 Kottappady------>Kaveed/Perakam
 Anjoor
 Puthusseri
 Chowwannoor---->Marathamcodu/Pazhunnana/Vellarakkadu/Eyyal/Parembadam
 Guruvayoor
 Chemmannoor
 vylathoor ------>Attupuram
 Parannoor

2017 Storm 

In 2017 June 25, a hurricane happened in Arthat causing great damages to all the churches in Arthat. The small, old St.Thomas Catholic church had to be reconstructed because of it.

In Literature 
History of the church is well narrated in the fiction novel Francis Itticora by T.D. Ramakrishnan.

References

 

Churches in Thrissur district
Cathedrals in Kerala
Malankara Orthodox Syrian church buildings